Brian Davis may refer to:
 Brian Davis (bishop) (1934–1998), New Zealand bishop
 Brian Davis (American football) (born 1963), American football player
 Brian Davis (basketball) (born 1970), American basketball player
 Brian Davis (golfer) (born 1974), English professional golfer
 Brian J. Davis (born 1953), Florida judge and federal judicial nominee
 Brian Joseph Davis (born 1975), Canadian artist and writer
 Brian Davis (diplomat), former Canadian ambassador to Syria
 Brian Davis (sportscaster), broadcaster for the Oklahoma City Thunder
 Brian Davis (politician) (1934–2018), Australian politician
Brian Davis, character in 80,000 Suspects
 Brian Davis, minor character in Heroes
 Lead character in TV series What About Brian
 Narrator of TV series Sleep On It

See also
 Brian Davies (disambiguation)
 Bryan Davis (disambiguation)